Samois was a lesbian-feminist BDSM organization based in San Francisco that existed from 1978 to 1983. It was the first lesbian BDSM group in the United States. It took its name from Samois-sur-Seine, the location of the fictional estate of Anne-Marie, a lesbian dominatrix character in Story of O, who pierces and brands O. The co-founders were writer Pat Califia, who identified as a lesbian at the time, Gayle Rubin, and sixteen others.

The roots of Samois were in a group called Cardea, a women's discussion group within the mixed-gender BDSM group called the Society of Janus. Cardea existed from 1977 to 1978 before discontinuing, but a core of lesbian members, including Califia and Rubin, were inspired to start Samois on June 13, 1978, as an exclusively lesbian BDSM group.

Samois was strongly rebuked (and sometimes picketed) by Women Against Violence in Pornography and Media (WAVPM), an early anti-pornography feminist group. WAVPM, like later anti-pornography feminists, was very strongly opposed to sadomasochism, seeing it as ritualized violence against women. Samois members felt strongly that their way of practicing SM was entirely compatible with feminism, and held that the kind of feminist sexuality advocated by WAVPM was conservative and puritanical. Samois openly confronted WAVPM with their position, and the exchanges between the two groups were among the earliest battles of what later became known as the Feminist Sex Wars, with Samois being among the very earliest advocates of what came to be known as sex-positive feminism.

The book Coming to Power, edited by members of the Samois group and published in 1981, was a founding work of the lesbian BDSM movement.

In the 1982 work Against Sadomasochism Judith Butler, credited as "Judy Butler," criticizes Samois in her essay "Lesbian S&M: The Politics of Dis-Illusion."  Several other essays in the work also criticize it.

Samois split up in 1983 amid personal infighting; however, in 1984 Gayle Rubin went on to help form another organization called The Outcasts. The Outcasts lasted until 1997, until they too split due to infighting. A breakaway group, The Exiles, is still extant as of 2012 and carries on in the tradition of Samois and The Outcasts. In 2012, The Exiles in San Francisco received the Small Club of the Year award as part of the Pantheon of Leather Awards.

In 1996, Pat Califia and Robin Sweeney published an anthology titled The Second Coming: A Leatherdyke Reader that also contained historical information on The Outcasts, as well as other lesbian BDSM groups such as the Lesbian Sex Mafia and Briar Rose.

In 2007 the National Leather Association International inaugurated awards for excellence in SM/fetish/leather writing. The categories include the Samois award for anthology.

In 2019 Samois was inducted into the Leather Hall of Fame.

References

Further reading
 Rubin, Gayle. 2004. Samois. Leather Times 21:3–7. Available from: https://web.archive.org/web/20090327070824/http://www.leatherarchives.org/resources/issue21.pdf
 Samois. 1979. What Color is Your Handkerchief: A Lesbian S/M Sexuality Reader. Berkeley: SAMOIS. 45 p.
 Samois. 1987. Coming to Power: Writings and Graphics on Lesbian S/M. Third edition, revised and updated. Boston: Alyson Pubns. 287 p. .

External links
 The Exiles - official site
 "Cardea ~ Samois ~ Outcasts ~ Exiles" by Drake Cameron, TheExiles.org, December 2002.
 "Lesbian Sex Mafia ('L S/M') Speakout" by Fran Moira, off our backs 12(6), June 30, 1982. (Archived at Archive.org.)

1978 establishments in California
1983 disestablishments in California
BDSM organizations
LGBT culture in San Francisco
Feminism and BDSM
Feminism in California
Feminist organizations in the United States
Lesbian culture in California
Lesbian organizations in the United States
Lesbian BDSM
Organizations based in San Francisco
Organizations established in 1978
Sex-positive feminism
Sexuality in San Francisco